Arne Arnardo (19 October 1912 – 4 May 1995), born Arne Otto Lorang Andersen, was a Norwegian circus performer and -owner, generally referred to as the "circus king" of Norway. He escaped with the circus at an early age, took the stage name "Arnardo", and developed proficiency in several different acts. In 1949, he opened his own circus, under the name of Cirkus Arnardo.

Biography
Arnardo was born in Sarpsborg, the son of lumberjack Einar Andersen and his wife Elna. He was interested in the entertainment industry from an early age, and escaped with Cirkus Empress as a teenager. Here he worked as a contortionist, illusionist and acrobat. In 1927, he took the stage name "Arnardo", under which he was invariably known since. He also performed as  an equilibrist, trapeze artist, hypnotist and ventriloquist. In 1939 he became director of Cirkus Berny, before he was finally able to open his own circus in 1949 – under the name Cirkus Arnardo. Through a keen sense for public relations, Arnardo built the brand of his circus to become the best-known in Norway. He died in his caravan during a show in Tøyen, Oslo, in 1995.

Works and honours
Arnardo played in the movie Cirkus Fandango in 1954, and authored the autobiography Sirkusliv (Circus Life) in 1962. In 1973 he received the King's Medal of Merit in gold, and he was made Knight, First Class, of the Royal Norwegian Order of St. Olav 1988. He was married twice; to Gerd Gløgaard and Eva Sørensen, née Steene. After Arne Arnardo's death, his son Arild took over the role as director of Cirkus Arnardo.

References

Further reading

1912 births
1995 deaths
Norwegian circus performers
Circus owners
Contortionists
Ventriloquists
Recipients of the King's Medal of Merit in gold
People from Sarpsborg